The community of Germans with Indian background includes Indian expatriates in Germany, as well as German citizens of Indian origin or descent. In 2009, the German government estimated that the number of people of Indian descent residing in Germany at 110,204, of which 43,175 people were holding an Indian passport, while 67,029 were holding a German passport. In 2020 the number stood at about 177,000 of Indian descent of which 139,000 had a migration background. According to the Federal Statistical Office the number of nationals from India is the second largest in Germany from either South, South East, East or Central Asia, only below the number of nationals from Afghanistan. Majority of the Indians are Tamils and Bengalis. While other significant Indian Communities are Telugus, Punjabis, Malayalis and Gujaratis.

History
In early to late 1960s and 1970s, many Malayali Catholic women from Kerala were recruited by the German Catholic institutions to work as nurses in German hospitals.  According to the documentary ‘Translated lives’, around 5,000 women migrated from Kerala during the 1960s and 70s to become nurses there.

Modern era
Germany has become a popular destination for higher learning, and of the total student population in Germany about 12% are International students. Hundreds of schools in India have signed up to teach students German as their primary foreign language as part of an effort by Germany's top technical colleges to attract more Indian students. As a result, there has been a steady increase in the Indian student population in Germany which has quadrupled in 7 years since 2008. Of these, more than 80% Indian students pursue their studies or research in the STEM fields i.e., Science, Technology, Engineering and Mathematics.

Notable people
Rahul Kumar Kamboj, first Indian City Parliament Member of Frankfurt
Dhruv Rathee, Youtuber
Evelyn Sharma, Bollywood actress
Mink Brar, actress
Ayesha Kapur, actress
Sandeep Bhagwati, composer
Rahul Peter Das, South Asianist (Martin Luther University of Halle-Wittenberg) and President of the German Association for Asian Studies
Robin Dutt, football club manager
Sebastian Edathy, member of the German parliament (Social Democratic Party)
Collien Fernandes, media person
Shanta Ghosh, sprinter
Gujjula Ravindra Reddy, member of the state parliament of Brandenburg and former mayor of Altlandsberg (Social Democratic Party)
Joybrato Mukherjee, Professor of English Linguistics and the President of the University of Giessen.Youngest university president ever appointed in Germany. President of the German Academic Exchange Service (DAAD)
Judith Lefeber, singer
Subrata K. Mitra, political scientist (Heidelberg University, retired)
Xavier Naidoo, singer
Anita Bose Pfaff, economist, daughter of Subhas Chandra Bose
Kamala Reddy, Hindu guru
Sabrina Setlur, singer and ex-girlfriend of Boris Becker
Shweta Shetty, singer
Ashok-Alexander Sridharan, Ex-Mayor of Bonn
Indira Weis, singer
Josef Winkler, member of the German parliament (Alliance '90/The Greens)
Atul Chitnis, open-source software developer
Tino Sehgal, Berlin-based artist of Indian and British descent
Irshad Panjatan, Berlin-based actor and mime artist of Indian descent
Anuradha Doddaballapur, Germany National Women's cricket Team captain
Sharanya Sadarangani, Germany National Women's cricketer
Karthika Vijayaraghavan, Germany National Women's cricketer
Kedar Jadhav , Social Worker

See also

Germany–India relations
Romani people in Germany
Tamil Germans

References

Further reading

External links
 Indians in Magdeburg - a student initiative that helps and provides useful information to non-German speakers, especially Indian students
 Magdeburg Indians- Magdeburg Indians e.V. - a private organization registered in Magdeburg, Germany, Saxony-Anhalt
Deutsch-Indische Gesellschaft
 Indians in Germany
Indians In Germany
 Indien-Institut in Munich/Bavaria ; attached to Völkerkundemuseum
 Escape from East Germany 1972, autobiographical account of an Indian Ph.D. student in Dresden who married an East German woman
 Marathi Katta Germany, Frankfurt - A Marathi Indian Community, a non-profit organization serving Marathi/Maharashtrian Indian community living in Germany for many years.